Ken Skeen (born 20 March 1942) is an English former footballer who played for Oxford United, Cheltenham Town and Swindon Town. He made a total of 270 appearances for Oxford, scoring 40 goals.

References

External links
Rage Online profile

1942 births
English footballers
Association football forwards
Trowbridge Town F.C. players
Swindon Town F.C. players
Oxford United F.C. players
Cheltenham Town F.C. players
English Football League players
Living people